The protected areas of South Sudan include national parks, game reserves, forest reserves, nature conservation areas, and bird sanctuaries. Protected areas cover 15.5% of the country's land area.



Forest reserves
Imatong Forest Reserve



Nature conservation areas
Lake Ambadi Nature Conservation Area
Lake No Nature Conservation Area

Bird sanctuaries
Lake Abiad Bird Sanctuary

International designations

Ramsar Sites
Sudd

References

 
South Sudan
protected areas